Julius Reinhardt may refer to:

 Hank Reinhardt (Julius Henry Reinhardt, 1934–2007), American author, armorer and authority on medieval weaponry
 Julius Reinhardt (footballer) (born 1988), German footballer

See also
 Reinhardt (disambiguation)